Amir Adnan is a Pakistani fashion designer who founded and runs the eponymous brand.
 
Some of their sub-brand names include, Huma Adnan's FnkAsia, Craft Stories by Huma Adnan, and Parishae Adnan's Awami. 

Amir Adnan began the business of fashion clothing for men in 1990, and has, over the past three decades, built a renowned name that is also lauded for quality work. He is also credited for having glamorized the sherwani in modern times.

Personal life 
Amir Adnan (born January 23, 1965) is a descendant of the Royal Dhaka Nawab family. He is the great-grandson of Nawab Sir Khwaja Salimullah, who was the founder of the All-India Muslim League in 1906. He is married to designer Huma Adnan, with whom he has three children: son, Shafae Adnan, and daughters, Parishae Adnan, and Nichae Adnan. Amir Adnan is also a prominent alumnus of the Institute of Business Administration (IBA) in Karachi, Pakistan.

Awards and achievements 
Pride of Performance Award by the President of Pakistan in 2006 for his outstanding achievements in the field of Arts and Design.

He has also won “Best Menswear Designer” at the Lux Style Awards, once in 2006, and at another time in 2016. This award ceremony, held in Pakistan since 2002, is a celebration of style, and is one of the oldest events that pay homage to the entertainment and fashion industry. 

Amir Adnan has also given a TEDTalk in November 2017 for TEDxNUSTKarachi, with regards to revolutionizing the fashion industry.
Opened AMIR ADNAN TRADING LLC in Dubai in 2004, becoming the first Pakistani designer to launch his international flagship store in Dubai (Al Wasl Road, Jumeirah) that later expanded to Sharjah at Mega Mall and Oudh Metha, opposite Lamcy Plaza. However due to recession, the stores had to be closed after 15 years of business.

Notable memberships 
Out of the two notable fashion councils in Pakistan, Amir Adnan has been involved in varying capacities in both. He is a founding member of Fashion Pakistan, of which he has been the CEO twice. Moreover, he has also been on the board of the Pakistan Institute of Fashion Design.

Showcased work 
Amir Adnan’s work has been showcased at numerous events, such as Dubai Fashion Week, Fashion Week Karachi, Fashion Week Lahore, and the Fox TV Live Show in LA. He also displayed his collection at Fashion Pakistan Week (FPW) in Spring/Summer 2018 in Karachi while creating awareness about the deaf community, and having members participate in the walk.

References

Clothing retailers of Pakistan
Clothing brands of Pakistan
Clothing companies of Pakistan
Recipients of the Pride of Performance